IPTC 7901 is a news service text markup specification published by the International Press Telecommunications Council that was designed to standardize the content and structure of text news articles. It was formally approved in 1979, and is still the world's most common way of transmitting news articles to newspapers, web sites and broadcasters from news services.

Using fixed metadata fields and a series of control and other special characters, IPTC 7901 was designed to feed text stories to both teleprinters and computer-based news editing systems. Stories can be assigned to broad categories (such as sports or culture) and be given a higher or lower priority based upon importance.

Although superseded in the early 1990s by IPTC Information Interchange Model and later by the XML-based News Industry Text Format, 7901's huge existing user base has persisted.

IPTC 7901 is closely related to ANPA-1312 (also known as ANPA 84-2 and later 89-3) of the Newspaper Association of America.

External links
 IPTC Website
 specification on iptc.org

References 

Metadata